Hirmand County is in Sistan and Baluchestan province, Iran. The capital of the county is the city of Dust Mohammad. At the 2006 census, the region's population (as Hirmand District of Zabol County) was 73,254 in 14,677 households. The following census in 2011 counted 65,471 people in 14,835 households, by which time the district had been separated from the county to form Hirmand County. At the 2016 census, the county's population was 63,979 in 16,559 households.

Administrative divisions

The population history and structural changes of Hirmand County's administrative divisions over three consecutive censuses are shown in the following table. The latest census shows two districts, five rural districts, and one city.

References

 

Counties of Sistan and Baluchestan Province